Hákon Arnar Haraldsson (born 10 April 2003) is an Icelandic professional footballer who plays as a midfielder for Danish Superliga club Copenhagen and the Iceland national team.

Club career
Hákon Arnar is a youth academy graduate of Icelandic club ÍA. He made his senior debut for the club on 26 February 2019 in a 6–0 league cup win against Stjarnan.

In June 2019, Hákon Arnar joined youth academy of Danish club Copenhagen. On 21 May 2021, club announced that he have signed a new contract with the club until June 2026. He made his senior debut for the club on 29 July 2021 in a 5–0 UEFA Europa Conference League qualifying round win against Torpedo-BelAZ Zhodino.

International career
Hákon Arnar is a current Icelandic youth national team player. On 2 September 2021, he scored twice in his team's 2–1 win over Belarus in 2023 UEFA European Under-21 Championship qualification stage.

Hákon Arnar made his Iceland senior team debut on 2 June 2022 in a 2–2 draw against Israel.

Personal life
Hákon Arnar was born into a family of footballers. His parents Haraldur Ingólfsson and Jónína Víglundsdóttir are former national team players. His brother Tryggvi Hrafn is also a professional footballer.

Career statistics

Club

International

Honours
Copenhagen
 Danish Superliga: 2021–22

International
Baltic Cup: 2022

Individual
 Icelandic Men's Footballer of the Year: 2022

References

External links
 
 Copenhagen profile
 

2003 births
Living people
Association football midfielders
Icelandic footballers
Iceland youth international footballers
Iceland under-21 international footballers
Danish Superliga players
F.C. Copenhagen players
Íþróttabandalag Akraness players
Icelandic expatriate footballers
Icelandic expatriate sportspeople in Denmark
Expatriate men's footballers in Denmark